The Book of Joshua lists almost 400 ancient Levantine city names (including alternative names and derivatives in the form of words describing citizens of a town) which refer to over 300 distinct locations in Israel, the West Bank, Jordan, Lebanon and Syria. Each of those cities, with minor exceptions (e.g. Hamath, Gubla) is placed in one of the 12 regions, according to the tribes of Israel and in most cases additional details like neighbouring towns or geographical landmarks are provided. It has been serving as one of the primary sources for identifying and locating a number of Middle Bronze to Iron Age Levantine cities mentioned in ancient Egyptian and Canaanite documents, most notably in the Amarna correspondence.

The list of cities and suggested locations

See also 
 List of biblical places
 List of biblical names
 List of minor biblical places
 List of modern names for biblical place names
 Amarna letters–localities and their rulers

References 

 
Hebrew Bible cities
Cities
Historical geography
Land of Israel

Lists of cities in Asia